Since 1963, the Philippine Atmospheric, Geophysical and Astronomical Services Administration (PAGASA) has assigned local names to a tropical cyclone should it move into or form as a tropical depression in their area of responsibility located between 135°E and 115°E and between 5°N-25°N, even if the cyclone has had an international name assigned to it. All three agencies that have assigned names to tropical cyclones within the Western Pacific have retired the names of significant tropical cyclones, with the PAGASA retiring names if a cyclone has caused at least  (~20 million USD) in damage and/or have caused at least 300 deaths within the Philippines.

Since 1963, the naming lists have been revised in 1979, 1985, 2001 (after a contest called the "Name a Bagyo Contest", conducted by the PAGASA in 1998, where 140 entries were submitted in 1998 to revise the naming system for typhoons within their area of responsibility starting that season), 2005 (for various reasons, including to help minimize confusion in the historical records and to remove the names that might have negative associations with real persons), and 2021 (where the "Reserved List" was introduced). Within this list, all information with regards to intensity is taken from while the system was in the Philippine Area of Responsibility, and is thus taken from the PAGASA's archives, rather than the Joint Typhoon Warning Center (JTWC) or Japan Meteorological Agency (JMA)'s archives.

Background

The practice of using names to identify tropical cyclones goes back several centuries, with tropical cyclones being named after affected places, saints or things they hit before the formal start of naming in the Western Pacific. These included the Kamikaze, 1906 Hong Kong typhoon, 1922 Swatow typhoon and the 1934 Muroto typhoon.

The practice of retiring significant names was started during 1955 by the United States Weather Bureau in the Atlantic Ocean, after hurricanes Carol, Edna, and Hazel struck the Northeastern United States and caused a significant amount of damage in the previous year. Initially the names were only designed to be retired for ten years after which they might be reintroduced, however, it was decided at the 1969 Interdepartmental hurricane conference, that any significant hurricane in the future would have its name permanently retired. Several names have been removed from the naming lists by the PAGASA for other reasons, than causing a significant amount of death/destruction, which include being similar to other names and political reasons.

PAGASA has removed names from the list for various other reasons, than causing a significant amount of death/destruction. These names include Gloria in 2005, due to President Gloria Macapagal Arroyo's disputed win in the 2004 Philippine presidential election and her subsequent involvement in the Hello Garci scandal and Nonoy in 2015 which sounded similar to Noynoy, which was President Benigno Aquino III's nickname.

, 71 tropical cyclone names have been retired by the PAGASA, with the most recent being Jolina, Maring, and Odette of the previous typhoon season.

Names retired

See also
Typhoons in the Philippines
List of retired Atlantic hurricane names
List of retired Pacific hurricane names
List of retired Pacific typhoon names
List of retired Australian cyclone names
List of retired South Pacific tropical cyclone names

Notes

References

External links
Philippine Atmospheric, Geophysical and Astronomical Services Administration
Why typhoon names get retired

Pacific typhoons, retired